The official medal tally of the first Afro-Asian Games held at Hyderabad, India. China bagged the largest number of gold medals, followed by the host India in second place.

References

External links
 Medal tally

2003 Afro-Asian Games